The Brinje Tunnel is a four-lane tunnel in Croatia, an integral part of the A1 motorway located between Brinje and Žuta Lokva interchanges. The Brinje Tunnel is located immediately to the south of the Mala Kapela Tunnel, the longest tunnel in Croatia.

The tunnel is tolled within the A1 motorway closed toll collection system, and there are no separate toll plazas related to the tunnel use.

Characteristics 

The Brinje Tunnel consists of two tubes, opened for traffic in 2004. The northern portal of the tunnel is located at an elevation of 496 m.a.s.l., while its southern portal is found at 495 m.a.s.l.

The tunnel is equipped with the most recent traffic management and security systems, including video surveillance, automatic detection of congestion and variable information traffic sign systems.  There are 3 passages connecting the two tunnel tubes, accessible on foot. Naturally, the tunnel also has firefighting capabilities and fire detection systems.

Electronic equipment of the tunnel facilitates use of two UHF frequencies (HR1 102.3 MHz and HR2 97.5 MHz) and use of cell phones.

Speed limit applied in the tunnel is 100 km/h.

Safety 

In 2007 the Brinje Tunnel was declared to be the safest tunnel in Europe in 2007 by the FIA and the German motoring club ADAC. The award was presented following an assessment of 150 tunnels in Europe carried out between 2005 and 2007 within the framework of European Tunnel Assessment Programme (EuroTAP), supported by the European Commission, coordinated by FIA and led by German motoring club ADAC.

Traffic volume 

Traffic is regularly counted and reported by Hrvatske autoceste, operator of the motorway, and published by Hrvatske ceste. Substantial variations between annual (AADT) and summer (ASDT) traffic volumes are attributed to the fact that the motorway carries substantial tourist traffic to the Dalmatian Adriatic resorts. The traffic count is performed using analysis of toll ticket sales.

See also 
 A1 motorway
 Mala Kapela Tunnel
 Sveti Rok Tunnel
 List of longest tunnels

References

External links 
 
 EuroTAP

Road tunnels in Croatia
Buildings and structures in Lika-Senj County
Tunnels completed in 2004